is a former Japanese football player.

Playing career
Uchidate was born in Saitama on January 15, 1974. After graduating from Sendai University, he joined his local club Urawa Reds in 1996. He played many matches from 2000 and he became a regular player as left defender of three back defense and defensive midfielder from 2002. The club won the champions 2003 J.League Cup and 2005 Emperor's Cup. In 2006, although he played as substitute, he played many matches and the club won the champions J1 League. From 2007, although his opportunity to play decreased, the club won the champions AFC Champions League. He retired end of 2008 season.

Club statistics

References

External links

1974 births
Living people
Sendai University alumni
Association football people from Saitama Prefecture
Japanese footballers
J1 League players
J2 League players
Urawa Red Diamonds players
Association football defenders